Alampur is a town and former Rajput petty princely state on Saurashtra peninsula, in Gujarat, western India.

History 
The princely state, in Gohelwar prant, was ruled by Gohel Rajput Chieftains. During the British Raj, it was in the charge of the colonial Eastern Kathiawar Agency.

It comprised only the single village, with a population of 497 in 1901, yielding 4,500 Rupees state revenue (1903-4, mostly from land), paying 1,397 Rupees tribute to the Gaekwar Baroda State and Junagadh State.

References

External links and Sources 
 Imperial Gazetteer, on DSAL.UChicago.edu - Kathiawar

History of Gujarat
Kathiawar Agency
Princely states of Gujarat